Cordyla richardii is a species of flowering plant in the family Fabaceae.

It is native to Sudan, South Sudan, and Uganda.

References

Amburaneae
Flora of South Sudan
Flora of Sudan
Flora of Uganda
Vulnerable plants
Taxonomy articles created by Polbot